Stromerichthys is an extinct genus of prehistoric ray-finned fish that lived during the Late Cretaceous epoch.

See also

Prehistoric fish
List of prehistoric bony fish

References

Late Cretaceous fish
Cretaceous fish of Europe
Prehistoric fish of Africa
Prehistoric ray-finned fish genera